The 49th District of the Iowa Senate is located in eastern Iowa, and is currently composed of Clinton and Scott Counties.

Current elected officials
Chris Cournoyer is the senator currently representing the 49th District.

The area of the 49th District contains two Iowa House of Representatives districts:
The 97th District (represented by Norlin Mommsen)
The 98th District (represented by Mary Wolfe)

The district is also located in Iowa's 2nd congressional district, which is represented by Mariannette Miller-Meeks.

Past senators
The district has previously been represented by:

Jack Hester, 1983–1992
Tom Vilsack, 1993–1998
Mark Shearer, 1999–2002
Hubert Houser, 2003–2012
Rita Hart, 2013–2018
Chris Cournoyer, 2019–present

References

49